Huanta District is one of eight districts of the Huanta Province in Peru. Its seat is Huanta.

Geography 
Other mountains are listed below:

 Ch'aki Qucha
 Mataru Q'asa
 Quri Willka
 Titi Q'asa
 Yana Waqra

Some of the largest lakes of the district are Qarqarqucha, Ichmaqucha, Mituqucha, Muruqucha, Chakaqucha, San Antonio, Yanaqucha, Pampaqucha, Pisququcha, Jarjaqucha and Hatun Tiklla.

The most important river is the Kachimayu ("salt river") on the western border of the district. It is an affluent of the Mantaro River.

Ethnic groups 
The people in the district are mainly indigenous citizens of Quechua descent. Quechua is the language which the majority of the population (52.78%) learnt to speak in childhood, 46.89% of the residents started speaking using the Spanish language (2007 Peru Census).

See also 
 Pusuquy Pata

References